Koo Kwang-ming (15 October 1926 – 27 February 2023) was a Taiwanese statesman, businessman, and independence activist.

Personal life
Koo was the eighth son of Koo Hsien-jung, a prominent Lukang businessman who had relocated to Taipei at the time of the Treaty of Shimonoseki, when Taiwan was ceded by the Qing Dynasty to the Empire of Japan. He swiftly made common cause with the Japanese colonial authorities in Taiwan and grew extremely wealthy during the period of Japanese rule. The family proved adept at bending with the political winds, and Koo's older brother Koo Chen-fu became a confidant of Chiang Kai-shek. Koo Kwang-ming, however, went into exile in Japan after the 228 massacre, where he lived for decades as an advocate for Taiwanese independence. His son born in Kobe, Richard Koo, is a prominent economist in Japan.

Koo was married twice and had three children. Koo died at Taipei Veterans General Hospital on 27 February 2023. A memorial was held in early March 2023 at Taiwan New Constitution Foundation offices in Taipei.

Political career
Koo enrolled at what became National Taiwan University in 1941 to study political science. He became chair of the school's student association, and was actively opposed to the Kuomintang. He left Taiwan for Hong Kong soon after the 228 incident, and later settled in Japan. In 1972, Koo traveled in secret from Japan via Thailand to Taiwan. He met Chiang Ching-kuo, son of ruler Chiang Kai-shek to argue for the lifting of martial law. As a consequence he was expelled from the Japanese chapter of WUFI. The younger Chiang invited Koo to end his exile to "share in the affairs of the country". Koo accepted, but on landing in Taiwan was upset to see his return described as "surrender" in an evening newspaper. He replied that he "had not returned to surrender, but to bring my influence to bear [on the situation]". Influential independence activist Su Beng contradicted this assertion, accusing Koo of "surrendering to the Chiang government". Koo joined the Democratic Progressive Party in 1996, when fellow independence activist Peng Ming-min received its presidential nomination. Koo later served president Chen Shui-bian as an adviser, resigning his post and DPP membership in 2005.

2008 DPP leadership bid
After the DPP's comprehensive defeat in the 2008 presidential elections, a leadership election was held to find the new party chairperson. Koo, then 82 years old, stood as a candidate. The campaign was notable for controversial remarks made by Koo about the suitability of an unmarried woman to lead, widely interpreted as an attack on the eventual winner, Tsai Ing-wen, who became the first elected female head of the party.

Koo was appointed adviser to Tsai Ing-wen in November 2016, four months after she had taken office as President of the Republic of China.

Philanthropy
In 2014 Koo announced that he would be giving away half of his fortune, NT$3 billion, through his New Taiwan Peace Foundation. This included prizes such as an award for Taiwanese historical fiction.

Political stances
After Panama ended bilateral relations with Taiwan in June 2017, Koo and Yu Shyi-kun announced that the Tsai Ing-wen administration should renounce the Republic of China and seek international recognition as Taiwan.

References

Bibliography

 

1926 births
2023 deaths
Hokkien businesspeople
Taiwanese exiles
Taiwan independence activists
Taiwanese people of Hoklo descent
Taiwanese politicians of Japanese descent
Koo family of Lukang
National Taiwan University alumni
Senior Advisors to President Chen Shui-bian
Senior Advisors to President Tsai Ing-wen